In American folklore, the dungavenhooter is a fearsome critter akin to a large crocodylian animal, lacking a mouth, which consumes prey by pulverizing its victims into a fine powder and snorting them through a set of large nostrils.

Characteristics
The dungavenhooter appears in the 1939 book on folklore, Fearsome Critters, by Henry H. Tryon, wherein the animal is purported by Tryon to make its habitat in marshlands between Maine and Michigan. Tryon relates that the dungavenhooter stalks its prey from behind brush with "Satanic cunning" while it waits for passing prey. The dungavenhooter is partial to devour intoxicated individuals of which Tryon relates, "Rum-sodden prey is sought with especial eagerness." Subsequently, the dungavenhooter catches its prey by surprise pounding them into vapor with its tail and inhaling them through its nose. It should, however, be noted that the dungavenhooter is not to be confused with the Dungarvon Whooper, a ghost legend from the Canadian province of New Brunswick.

See also
Fearsome critters
Dungarvon Whooper
Hodag

References

Fearsome critters
Tall tales